Cedar Mills is a city in Meeker County, Minnesota, United States. The population was 45 at the 2010 census.

History
Cedar Mills was laid out in 1860, and named for nearby Cedar Lake. A post office called Cedar Mills was established in 1870, and remained in operation until 1955.

Geography

Minnesota State Highways 7 and 22 are two of the main routes in the community. The Luce Line State Trail passes through the city.

Demographics

2010 census
As of the census of 2010, there were 45 people, 23 households, and 14 families residing in the city. The racial makeup of the city was 93.3% White, 2.2% Asian, and 4.4% from two or more races.

There were 23 households, of which 13.0% had children under the age of 18 living with them, 52.2% were married couples living together, 8.7% had a female householder with no husband present, and 39.1% were non-families. 39.1% of all households were made up of individuals, and 17.4% had someone living alone who was 65 years of age or older. The average household size was 1.96 and the average family size was 2.57.

The median age in the city was 49.3 years. 13.3% of residents were under the age of 18; 6.7% were between the ages of 18 and 24; 24.3% were from 25 to 44; 35.6% were from 45 to 64; and 20% were 65 years of age or older. The gender makeup of the city was 35.6% male and 64.4% female.

2000 census
As of the census of 2000, there were 53 people, 26 households, and 15 families residing in the city. The racial makeup of the city was 100.00% White.

There were 26 households, out of which 23.1% had children under the age of 18 living with them, 46.2% were married couples living together, 7.7% had a female householder with no husband present, and 42.3% were non-families. 42.3% of all households were made up of individuals, and 11.5% had someone living alone who was 65 years of age or older. The average household size was 2.04 and the average family size was 2.80.

In the city, the population was spread out, with 22.6% under the age of 18, 5.7% from 18 to 24, 30.2% from 25 to 44, 17.0% from 45 to 64, and 24.5% who were 65 years of age or older. The median age was 41 years. For every 100 females, there were 96.3 males. For every 100 females age 18 and over, there were 95.2 males.

The median income for a household in the city was $36,875, and the median income for a family was $51,875. Males had a median income of $35,000 versus $23,750 for females. The per capita income for the city was $17,998. None of the population and none of the families were below the poverty line.

References

Cities in Minnesota
Cities in Meeker County, Minnesota